Scouting in Martinique is administered by the Scouts et Guides de France as an overseas branch or region known as the Scouts et Guides de Martinique. Scouts participate in many Caribbean activities such as camps and jamborees. 

The Scout emblem incorporates elements of the old coat of arms of Martinique, as well as the old arms of French Guiana and Guadeloupe.

See also
 Scouting in France

Overseas branches of Scouting and Guiding associations
Scouting and Guiding in France